Purdue University Global, Inc (PG),  formerly Kaplan University, is a public online university that operates as a public-benefit corporation,  is part of the Purdue University system, and returns 12.5% of operating revenue to its former for-profit owner Graham Holdings Company (GHC). Purdue University Global's programs focus on career-oriented fields of study at the credential, associate's, bachelor's, master's, and doctoral level. The university also has three physical classroom locations and Concord Law School.

Purdue Global was created in April 2018 by Purdue University's acquisition and rebranding of the former private for-profit Kaplan University. Kaplan Higher Education continues to offer non-academic support services such as recruitment, admissions, human resources, marketing and technology support by contract, under the supervision of Purdue University, and most academic staff are former Kaplan employees. Its main campus (for accreditation purposes) is in Indianapolis, Indiana, and its online support centers are in Chicago, Illinois, and Fort Lauderdale, Florida.

History

Following several years of government scrutiny, media criticism, and significant enrollment decline, Graham Holdings Company sold Kaplan University to the Purdue University system for one dollar in March 2018. Purdue rebranded the institution as Purdue University Global and agreed to employ Kaplan, Inc., a subsidiary of GHC, as the exclusive provider of nonacademic functions. Kaplan, Inc. agreed to assume responsibility for liabilities resulting before the transaction. According to the contract terms, Kaplan would receive 12.5 percent of the university's revenue, as long as funds are available after all operating expenses and guaranteed payments to Purdue have been covered.

Purdue University president, Mitch Daniels, announced the intent to acquire Kaplan University in April 2017. From 2017 to January 2018, the school's temporary placeholder name was NewU. Purdue University Global's lineage is rooted in a series of for-profit colleges: American Institute of Commerce (1937–1999), Quest College (1999–2000), and Kaplan College (2000–2004), later renamed Kaplan University (2004–2017). In the years prior to its sale to Purdue University, Kaplan University's parent company, Kaplan Inc., closed or sold several schools, including Kaplan College (a primarily brick and mortar vocational school, not to be confused with the online university that became Kaplan University in 2004), and Kaplan Career Institute, which were purchased by Education Corporation of America in 2015. Kaplan University was the last accredited higher education institution owned by Kaplan, Inc.

In 2017, Purdue president Mitch Daniels stated that the Purdue University deal with Kaplan incurred "virtually no financial risk", and had a "strong upside potential". Critics and analysts disagreed with Daniels' assessment, and in order to obtain regulatory approval the U.S. Department of Education required Purdue to assume responsibility for Kaplan University's debt and liability "whether they are known or unknown, and whether they accrue prior to, or after the closing of the transaction" noting the debts and liabilities backed by Purdue "constitute an instrumentality of the state of Indiana for the purpose of the department's regulations". In the acquisition agreement Kaplan agreed to assume responsibility for liabilities resulting before the transaction, however the U.S. Department of Education "ultimately holds Purdue and the state of Indiana responsible for liabilities resulting from the operation of Kaplan University". Through the acquisition, Kaplan guaranteed Purdue priority payments of $10 million a year for the first five years following the transaction, of which $20 million was paid upon closing.

In 2017, Purdue University President Mitch Daniels said that the contrast between the typical Purdue West Lafayette student and the targeted Purdue Global student was "stark." According to Purdue Global, 60 percent of Kaplan's students were over age 30, and the mean student income at enrollment was $22,323. For 55 percent of the students, neither parent attended college.

According to Purdue University, Purdue Global had an $18 million loss in FY 2018, its first year of operation. Purdue University Treasurer Bill Sullivan said in regards to the 2018 finances, "losses are likely to continue another year, maybe two" and this was "a deliberate strategic choice and was, importantly, prefunded by Kaplan Higher Education (KHE) through the assets it brought to Purdue at acquisition" valued at more than $66 million in cash. Sullivan also stated that he expected "elevated startup costs to continue into 2019 and more modestly in 2020".

Graham Holdings Company, reported that it recorded $16.8 million in service fees with Purdue Global in 2018, based on an assessment of its collectability under the Transition and Operations Support Agreement. In April 2019, Purdue spokesman Tim Doty stated that Purdue University "has invested over $1 million so employees and their families can continue, complete or further their education" through Purdue University Global in the form an employee benefit that offers free tuition to all Purdue employees and their families.

In June 2018, it was estimated that Kaplan Higher Education would spend about $200 million on "back office services" and $100 million in marketing for Purdue Global. The Century Foundation claims that in 2016–17, before the change of management, the school spent 18 cents for instruction for every dollar of tuition received. Although Purdue Global has not stated the current ratio publicly, CFO Bill Sullivan dismissed such claims, saying lower costs are "the nature of the internet age. It also costs Amazon less to operate than Target and iTunes or Pandora less than your local record store."

In July 2019, Graham Holdings reported that Kaplan Higher Education's quarterly income had declined by 76 percent from the same period in 2018, caused by a combination of the sale to Purdue, Kaplan not qualifying for full reimbursement for it services from Purdue Global, and increased spending on marketing to support the launch of Purdue University Global. In January 2020, Purdue University reported Purdue Global's 2019 fiscal year numbers, showing a $43 million loss due to what it called "a deliberate one-time, $28.5 million marketing investment" as it launched the new university as well as "$9 million in accrued but unpaid KHE fee that won't need to be paid until the cash flow is positive".  According to the university, only "$5.5 million was a loss from operations." Purdue Global projected that it would have an operating surplus in 2020.

In February 2020, Graham Holdings Company reported that Purdue University Global owed Kaplan Higher Education $68.4 million for services and deferred fees and $18.6 million for an advance from the Kaplan University transaction. In May 2020, Graham Holdings Company reported that Purdue University Global owed Kaplan Higher Education $82.0 million for services and deferred fees and $18.7 million for an advance from the Kaplan University transaction. In June 2020, Purdue Global owed a reported $89.6 million to Kaplan in addition to $19.1 million for the advance. By October 2020, Purdue Global's debt to Kaplan was reduced to $94 million, due to increased enrollments and the closing of campuses. In October 2020, Purdue University Global reported -$47 million in net assets, with a net operating loss of $103 million. In 2020, Purdue Global received $816,781 from the CARES Act and $15,423,168 in the second round of federal Coronavirus relief.

In February 2020, Purdue University announced that Purdue Global would be holding a virtual reality component to its Los Angeles graduation ceremony. In March 2020, Frank Dooley replaced Betty Vandenbosch as chancellor of Purdue University Global.
In May 2020, Jon Harbor took over as provost of Purdue Global   and Marilyn Wideman, dean of the School of Nursing, announced her retirement.

Campus closings

At least ten Purdue Global physical locations closed since Purdue took over from Kaplan. Following the management change that put Purdue in charge, six physical classroom spaces were closed in 2019, including Hagerstown, Maryland; Milwaukee, Wisconsin; St. Louis, Missouri; Cedar Falls, Iowa; Mason City, Iowa; and Omaha, Nebraska. Its Lewiston, Maine, largely online campus, closed in March 2021, attributing the closure to the effects of the COVID-19 pandemic. The campus in Lincoln, Nebraska also closed.

Academic relationships within Purdue System 
Purdue Global operates as a separately accredited institution within the Purdue University system, is the only institution in the system operating as a public-benefit corporation, and the only in which 12.5% of operating revenue are redirected to its prior for-profit owner Graham Holdings Company.  Each campus of the Purdue University system has its own accreditation, leadership, faculty, programs, and admissions policies. As a result, transfers between the campuses are highly limited. Purdue Global is classified by the U.S. Department of Education as a four-year public university but it does not receive state tax dollars due to its benefit corporation status, and it is exempt from some of the public records disclosure requirements of public universities in Indiana. According to the 2017 law that enabled Purdue or any other Indiana university to create an affiliated education institution, it still must report financial, academic and student success data to Indiana regulators, and any decisions made by the traditional side of Purdue or emails received by Purdue's administration remain eligible to the open records law, even if they pertain to Purdue Global.

With the exception of Purdue Global, all degrees from all Purdue University campuses and Purdue degree programs offered through Indiana University – Purdue University Indianapolis and Purdue Polytechnic Institute share a similar diploma bearing the name of the institution granting the degree and the city in which it is given. Purdue Global graduates receive a diploma that uses the name "Purdue University Global" instead of the system name, and bears the Purdue Global logo in place of the Purdue University seal. Purdue University and Purdue University Global share the same alumni association.

In July 2019, Purdue Polytechnic Institute announced it had received a $12 million grant from the US Department of Labor to enable 5,000 students to go through a cybersecurity apprenticeship program over the next four years. The Polytechnic Institute will partner with Purdue Global to offer online instruction nationwide for "nontraditional students" seeking work in the cybersecurity industry.

Campus and learning site locations
Purdue University Global operates primarily online, though its main campus is in Indianapolis, Indiana. Purdue Global has additional learning sites in Iowa (Des Moines) and Maine (Augusta).

Finances

Global receives revenues from student tuition, tuition from corporate partners, grant or scholarship aid, Title IV funds, GI Bill funds, and Department of Defense Tuition Assistance. Title IV funds include Pell Grants and federal student loans.  The 2017–18 statistics are: 
Federal student loans: $78,642,648
Grant or scholarship aid: $64,847,510
Pell Grants: $55,790,475

In February 2021, Graham Holdings reported that Purdue Global owed Kaplan Higher Education $107.2 million: $87.3 million for services, fees and deferred fees and $19.9 million for an advance to the school. In 2021, Purdue University Global received $25,504,589 in federal aid through the American Rescue Plan. Purdue University Global's net position improved to -$43,378,000 in fiscal year 2021. On September 30, 2021, Purdue University's debt to Kaplan Higher Education was $113.5 million.

Offerings, enrollment, and student body 
Prior to Purdue's acquisition of Kaplan University, Kaplan had undergone several years of significant enrollment decline from a high of 60,000 students in 2015 to just 32,000 students enrolled in April 2017. By the time Kaplan University became Purdue University Global in April 2018, enrollment was "approximately 30,000". In 2019, President Daniels explained that due to an "overall market slowdown" Purdue Global was not yet “achieving the growth that we thought we might".   As of January 2020, following a $130 million marketing spend, the university claimed to have begun to reverse the enrollment decline in its first year of operation, growing 5 percent or 1,422 students to a total of 31,042 enrolled with 11 percent growth for bachelor's and graduate students, along with a 17 percent decline in certificate students, and a 5 percent decline in associate degree students. Indiana residents are offered discounted tuition and Purdue employees and their families are offered free tuition.

Purdue Global is academically organized into seven schools:
School of Business and Information Technology
Concord Law School Concord Law School is not accredited by the American Bar Association. As such, California is the only state allowing Concord's graduates to take the state bar exam. Concord's pass rate for the July 2018 sitting of the California bar exam was 29% for first-time takers and 9% for repeat takers, compared to 55% and 16% overall pass rates, respectively.
School of General Education
School of Health Sciences
School of Nursing Purdue University Global had a 91 percent NCLEX pass rate for registered nurse candidates in 2019. The pass rate was 58 percent in 2014 and 74 percent in 2017. The number of registered nurse candidates taking the NCLEX exam was 127 candidates in 2014, 159 candidates in 2017, and 94 candidates in 2019.
Open College
College of Social and Behavioral Sciences

Student body
Approximately 17 percent of Purdue Global's student body are full-time students. The demographics of the student population are 65 percent female, 57 percent white, 21 percent black, 12 percent Hispanic, 2 percent Asian, 1 percent Pacific Islander, and 1 percent Native American. While the socio-economic diversity of Purdue University is 17 percent, the federal government has not yet reported a diversity number for Purdue Global. According to former Purdue Global Chancellor Betty Vandenbosch, more than 28 percent of the student body is affiliated with the military, 52 percent are the first in their family to pursue a higher education degree, and 63 percent have a child or other dependent. About 4000 of Purdue Global's students are residents of Indiana.

Military servicemembers and veterans
In 2019, Purdue Global ranked seventh in Department of Defense Tuition Assistance funding, with 6825 servicemembers using the benefits. Total DOD funding was $14,875,918. Purdue Global's student body in 2020 included about 7000 servicemembers and 5000 veterans. Members of the US Army, National Guard, Reserves, and veterans can obtain an AAS degree in small group management with six courses, a bachelor's degree in liberal studies with seven additional courses and a master's in management with 10 additional courses. In 2020, the National Center of Academic Excellence in Cyber Defense Education designated Purdue Global as a member school. PG is one of about 200 members.

Corporate partnerships 
In February 2019, Papa John's Pizza announced that all its employees would receive free tuition at Purdue Global. In June 2019, Walmart announced that Purdue Global would be one of six schools in their Live Better U education benefit program. The program is being marketed with the "chance to get a degree for the cost of a dollar a day." In June 2019, security services firm Securitas announced an arrangement to cover at least 90% of the tuition costs toward four custom certificate programs developed in partnership with Purdue Global. In October 2019, ManTech began offering its employees tuition-free access to Purdue Global's Bachelor of Science in analytics degree.  Other organizations that have announced partnerships with Purdue Global to offer their employees a tuition-free or reduced-tuition college degree include New Balance. In September 2020, Purdue Global announced an agreement with Gallup "to develop and deliver an academic program to support Gallup's Straight to Business initiative...an undergraduate microcredential, aligned with and stackable into bachelor's degree opportunities in analytics, business administration, communication, and industrial/organizational psychology."

Guild Education
In January 2020, Disney Aspire added Purdue University Global to its Network of Educational Providers. The program is managed by Guild Education. Guild Education also provides student workers from Walmart, Discover, Chipotle, and other Fortune 1000 companies.

Academics 
Purdue University Global is an open admissions school that offers both traditional programs and standardized competency-based learning. This allows Purdue Global to offer college credit to students who can demonstrate they have mastered certain learning outcomes through professional and military training.

Accreditation
Like Purdue's other campuses, Purdue Global is accredited by the Higher Learning Commission. Specific degree programs are accredited by the ACBSP, ABET, CCNE, AHIMA, NALA, and others. Its Master of Science degree in finance is also registered with the Certified Financial Planner board and qualifies graduates to sit the CFP examination. Purdue Global's law school, Concord Law School, is the only fully online law school in the country. Given that the American Bar Association does not accredit online universities, the school is unaccredited by the ABA, but is accredited by the State Bar of California, allowing students to sit for the bar exam in that state.  Concord Law School students may also pursue an executive JD, designed for executives and others who seek graduate level training in law, but do not wish to become attorneys.

Faculty and learning systems
Following the acquisition, all Kaplan faculty became Purdue Global faculty which now include approximately 335 full-time faculty and 1,385 part-time faculty. Purdue University faculty are expected to become increasingly involved in launching programs and courses in the Purdue Global online system.  To date, three new programs have been approved to be created in collaboration with Purdue's West Lafayette faculty including programs in pharmacy, and aviation.

Purdue University Global uses ExcelTrack, a competency-based learning program. The individualized computer program is used to cut costs and speed up student progress. Students may take as many courses as they want "all for one flat price."

Student outcomes
According to the College Scorecard, Purdue University Global has a 33 percent graduation rate. Median salary after attending ranges from $21,000 (AA, teacher education) to $74,000 (BSN, nursing).  Two years into student loan repayment, with Purdue Global students 32 percent were in forbearance, 29 percent were not making progress, 12 percent were in deferment, 11 percent defaulted, 6 percent were making progress, 6 percent were delinquent, 2 percent had their loans discharged, and 1 percent had paid in full.College Navigator reports an overall graduation rate of 22 percent. As of the first quarter of 2019, the pass rates of Purdue University Global nursing graduates exceed national averages, a new development since the takeover of Purdue of Kaplan University.

Rankings

In 2021, Purdue Global ranked 389th out of 391 schools in the Washington Monthly list of national universities, with a social mobility ranking of 390th out of 391 schools.

Leadership and administration 

Mitch Daniels is the president of Purdue University Global. He reports to Purdue Global's board of trustees, which is appointed by the Purdue University board of trustees. Five of Purdue's University's trustees also serve on the Purdue Global board. Dr. Betty Vandenbosch serves as chancellor of Purdue Global and reports to the president of Purdue University and the six-member Purdue Global board of trustees. Vandenbosch previously was Dean of the School of Business and Information Technology at Kaplan University. Christopher Ruhl is the chief financial officer. Ruhl served as the senior vice president, chief financial officer, and general counsel at Ivy Tech Community College from 2012 to 2017. He also was director of the Indiana Office of Management & Budget (OMB), director of the Indiana State Budget Agency, and policy director and general counsel for the Indiana OMB under Governor Mitch Daniels.

On March 12, 2020, Purdue announced that Chancellor Betty Vandenbosch had resigned from her position effective April 3, 2020. On March 26, 2020, Purdue announced that Frank J. Dooley, PhD, previously Senior Vice Provost for Teaching and Learning at Purdue University, would take over as chancellor of Purdue University Global effective May 1, 2020.

Relationship with Kaplan Higher Education, Inc. 
As a requirement of the purchase of Kaplan University from Graham Holdings, Purdue University Global is required to employ Kaplan Higher Education, Inc.,  for 30 years as the exclusive provider of "marketing and advertising, front-end student advising, admissions support, financial aid and student finance, international student recruitment, test preparation, business office, technology support, human resources, finance and accounting functions". The Purdue trustees retain management control and responsibility over these areas.

According to the contract terms, Kaplan would receive 12.5 percent of the university's revenue, as long as funds were available after all operating expenses and guaranteed payments to Purdue have been covered. Kaplan guaranteed Purdue $10 million every year for the first five years. Kaplan would make up the difference if PG revenues were insufficient. At the time of purchase, Kaplan's owners paid $20 million to Purdue, pursuant to that agreement. The agreement also stipulates that if Purdue alters the university's operations in a way that significantly reduces the school's revenues, Kaplan could seek reimbursement for 12.5 percent of the lost revenue. An independent financial analyst would be tasked to adjudicate the issue. Since the acquisition, Purdue's leadership has made several changes including closing several physical locations where Kaplan University had operated.

If Purdue Global were to incur $25 million in cash operating losses for three consecutive years, or total cash operating losses of more than $75 million at any point, either Purdue or Kaplan Higher Education could terminate the contract.

According to Graham Holdings Company, "After the sixth year, Purdue Global has the right to terminate the agreement upon payment of an early termination fee equal to 125% of Purdue Global’s total revenue earned during the preceding 12-month period..."

Upon termination, Purdue University Global would retain the assets that Kaplan contributed, but would also assume responsibility for any liability arising from the operation of the institution. Bob Shireman of the Century Foundation argued the cost of buying out of the 30-year deal is "prohibitive."

Kaplan Higher Education is also an online program manager (OPM) of the Purdue University system.

Praise and criticism of acquisition 
In May 2017, the Purdue University Senate passed a resolution condemning the deal between Kaplan Higher Education and Purdue University. In September 2017, Senators Dick Durbin (D-IL) and Sherrod Brown (D-OH) warned that Purdue's acquisition of Kaplan University posed major risks for Purdue University's students and reputation. They added that Kaplan has a “shameful record” as a “predatory” school. Mitch Daniels, president of Purdue University, stated that the two senators were "misinformed". Regarding criticisms of Kaplan's for-profit days, Daniels quotes former Democratic senator Tom Harkin who led a massive 2011 investigation into the for-profit education sector but praised Kaplan for standing "alone among the large, for-profit education companies for having taken what are, in my opinion, real and significant steps to reduce high withdrawal rates and high default rates by implementing the Kaplan Commitment program."

In January 2018, the former Under Secretary of Education under Barack Obama, Ted Mitchell, praised the university that would become Purdue Global for its massive investments "in a learning platform that is, in my estimation, among the best in the country ... It is a 'lab' whose continued work promises insights not only for [Purdue Global] but for [Purdue University] and the wider field..." and that "Kaplan has been a pioneer in creating protections for students." Mitchell, the force behind Obama's Gainful Employment rules, also praised Kaplan for strong results and for taking action when they came up short, saying "Kaplan's results have been strong, and where they haven't, as in the failure of a number of their programs to meet the Gainful Employment thresholds, they have taken action to either remediate or close the programs...That's how we want institutions to react to troubling outcomes.” Arne Duncan, the former U.S. Secretary of Education under Obama who, with Mitchell, led a crackdown on the for-profit sector, praised the potential behind Purdue's acquisition of Kaplan University, saying “...I'm excited by this opportunity for a world-class university to expand its reach and help educate adult learners by acquiring a strong for-profit college. This is a first, and if successful, could help create a new model for what it means to be a land-grant institution.” Harvard researcher Todd Rogers praised the launch of Purdue Global for its potential to generate “more learning and greater scaled implementation of interventions that help students succeed" and that the university had "...a genuine commitment to using learning and motivational sciences to improve student outcomes, and to conducting high quality research to become a leader in contributing to those sciences".

On January 16, 2018, the Purdue Exponent editorial board stated that the Purdue University Global name was "downright deceitful" for using the Purdue name and not including the Kaplan name. In August 2018, former deputy undersecretary of education Bob Shireman called Purdue University Global "a for-profit college masquerading as a public university." Daniels pointed out that Shireman has been accused of misrepresenting facts in his criticisms and had been forced to leave the U.S. Department of Education under a cloud of accusations that he had colluded with short-sellers attempting to reduce stock values in the for-profit sector. PG initially required students to waive most rights to sue the school and submit disputes to arbitration. The American Association of University Professors called this policy “the stuff of predatory for-profit colleges, not a leading public research institution”. The AAUP petitioned the Higher Learning Commission, the school's accrediting body, on this issue. In September 2018, Senators Durbin and Brown called for Purdue to get rid of that policy, which came from the Kaplan rulebook. The policy was eliminated within the first year of the acquisition.

In January 2019, the Purdue Exponent stated that faculty were not consulted on the deliberations for the Purdue Global acquisition. Biologist David Sanders, a Purdue professor, university senate member, and local Democratic politician, hypothesized that the deal was enacted to help pay for the tuition freeze at the West Lafayette campus or that "'certain people see this as the future. I refer to it as the Walmart-ization of higher education....It's cheap, it's fast, but in two years, it'll be broken. The same thing is true with this sort of education.'" Sanders added he was concerned about Purdue University Global's $100 million marketing budget. That same month, professors at Purdue University complained that Purdue Global was enrolling traditional students, which was in opposition to what Global had originally promised. The PG chancellor responded while there was no formal policy that prevented a full-time, traditional student from enrolling in a course as a non-degree seeking student, it was not the university's intent to enroll such students, and that only five of PG's 29,000 students enrolled in a single course in 2018. In May 2019, three professors claimed that Purdue University Global was draining Purdue University's branch campuses, and the deal with Kaplan Higher Education was "online folly. Purdue University CFO Bill Sullivan responded that the degree to which the piece "misread Purdue's financial statements and distorted both the financial state and mission of Purdue Global is truly disappointing and unfortunate." Sullivan added that "In negotiating the acquisition of Kaplan University, we crafted an agreement that provided a nearly impenetrable defense of Purdue's finances.

In January 2020, the Chronicle of Higher Education published a report on Purdue Global titled :Purdue Global Has Had a Rocky Start. Is It Growing Pains or a Sign of Trouble?: In September 2020, the Century Foundation "raised questions about the documents Purdue University Global presented to the Internal Revenue Service when it applied for tax-exempt status in August 2019."  Purdue University denied the claims.

In the February issue of Emergency Medical News, two doctors questioned the vetting process of Purdue Global's nursing master's degree programs, which admitted all 500 applicants in Fall, 2019.

References

External links 
 

Educational institutions established in 2018
2018 establishments in Indiana
Distance education institutions based in the United States
Purdue University